Born for Trouble is the 38th studio album by country singer Willie Nelson. It was his first release of the 1990s. The album includes the singles "Ain't Necessarily So" and "Ten with a Two."

Track listing 
"Ain't Necessarily So"
"(I Don't Have a Reason) To Go to California Anymore"
"Ten With a Two"
"The Piper Came Today"
"You Decide"
"Pieces of My Life"
"It'll Come to Me"
"This Is How Without You Goes"
"Born for Trouble"
"Little Things Mean a Lot"

Charts

Weekly charts

Year-end charts

References

1990 albums
Willie Nelson albums
Columbia Records albums
Albums produced by Fred Foster